Jordan's Chapel is a historic Methodist chapel located near Pipestem, Summers County, West Virginia. It was built in 1852, and is a rectangular frame structure in the Greek Revival style.  It features a small louvered belfry with a louvered pyramidal roof.

It was listed on the National Register of Historic Places in 1980.

References

Churches on the National Register of Historic Places in West Virginia
Buildings and structures in Summers County, West Virginia
Churches completed in 1852
Greek Revival church buildings in West Virginia
Methodist churches in West Virginia
National Register of Historic Places in Summers County, West Virginia
1852 establishments in Virginia